Eddie Cantor (born Isidore Itzkowitz; January 31, 1892 – October 10, 1964) was an American comedian, actor, dancer, singer, songwriter, film producer, screenwriter and author. Familiar to Broadway, radio, movie, and early television audiences, this "Apostle of Pep" was regarded almost as a family member by millions because his top-rated radio shows revealed intimate stories and amusing anecdotes about his wife Ida and five daughters. Some of his hits include "Makin' Whoopee", "Ida (Sweet as Apple Cider)", "If You Knew Susie", "Ma! He's Making Eyes at Me", “Mandy”, "My Baby Just Cares for Me”, "Margie", and "How Ya Gonna Keep 'em Down on the Farm (After They've Seen Paree)?" He also wrote a few songs, including "Merrily We Roll Along", the Merrie Melodies Warner Bros. cartoon theme.

His eye-rolling song-and-dance routines eventually led to his nickname "Banjo Eyes". In 1933, artist Frederick J. Garner caricatured Cantor with large round eyes resembling the drum-like pot of a banjo. Cantor's eyes became his trademark, often exaggerated in illustrations, and leading to his appearance on Broadway in the musical Banjo Eyes (1941).

His charity and humanitarian work was extensive, and he helped to develop March of Dimes; he is credited with coining its name. Cantor was awarded an honorary Oscar in 1956 for distinguished service to the film industry.

Early life
Reports and accounts of Cantor's early life often conflict with one another. What is known is that he was born in New York City, the son of Mechel Iskowitz (also Michael), an amateur violinist, and his wife Meta Kantrowitz Iskowitz (also Maite), a young Jewish couple from Russia. It is generally accepted that he was born in 1892, though the day is subject to debate, with either January 31 or Rosh Hashanah, which was on September 10 or September 11, being reported. Although it was reported Cantor was an orphan, his mother dying in childbirth and his father of pneumonia, official records say otherwise; Meta died from complications of tuberculosis in July 1894 and the fate of Mechel is unclear, as no death certificate exists for him. There is also discrepancy as to his name; both his 1957 autobiography and The New York Times obituary for Cantor listed his birth name as Isidore Iskowitch but articles published after the 20th century list his birth name as Edward Israel Itzkowitz. His grandmother, Esther Kantrowitz (died January 29, 1917), took custody of him, and referred to him as Izzy and Itchik, both diminutives for Isidor, and his last name, due to a clerical error, was thought to be Kantrowitz and shortened to Kanter. No birth certificate existed for him, not unusual for someone born in New York in the 19th century.

Stage

Saloon songs to vaudeville
By his early teens, Cantor began winning talent contests at local theaters and started appearing on stage. One of his earliest paying jobs was doubling as a waiter and performer, singing for tips at Carey Walsh's Coney Island saloon, where a young Jimmy Durante accompanied him on piano. He made his first public appearance in Vaudeville in 1907 at New York's Clinton Music Hall. In 1912, he was the only performer over the age of 20 to appear in Gus Edwards's Kid Kabaret, where he created his first blackface character "Jefferson". He later toured with Al Lee as the team Cantor and Lee. Critical praise from that show got the attention of Broadway's top producer Florenz Ziegfeld, who gave Cantor a spot in the Ziegfeld rooftop post-show, Midnight Frolic (1917).

Broadway
A year later, Cantor made his Broadway debut in the Ziegfeld Follies of 1917. He continued in the Follies until 1927, a period considered the best years of the long-running revue. For several years, Cantor co-starred in an act with pioneer comedian Bert Williams, both appearing in blackface; Cantor played Williams's fresh-talking son. Other co-stars with Cantor during his time in the Follies included Will Rogers, Marilyn Miller, Fanny Brice, and W.C. Fields. He moved on to stardom in book musicals, starting with Kid Boots (1923) and Whoopee! (1928). On tour with Banjo Eyes, he romanced the unknown Jacqueline Susann, who had a small part in the show and who became the best-selling author of Valley of the Dolls.BANJO EYES' successful Broadway run was cut short when Cantor suffered a major heart attack---the first of several that would plague his later years.

Steel Pier, Atlantic City
Cantor was a headliner at The Steel Pier Theater in Atlantic City.

 Ziegfeld Follies of 1917 – revue – performer
 Ziegfeld Follies of 1918 – revue – performer, co-composer and co-lyricist for "Broadway's Not a Bad Place After All" with Harry Ruby
 Ziegfeld Follies of 1919 – revue – performer, lyricist for "(Oh! She's the) Last Rose of Summer"
 Ziegfeld Follies of 1920 – revue – composer for "Green River", composer and lyricist for "Every Blossom I See Reminds Me of You" and "I Found a Baby on My Door Step"
 The Midnight Rounders of 1920 – revue – performer
 Broadway Brevities of 1920 – revue – performer
 Make It Snappy (1922) – revue – performer, co-bookwriter
 Ziegfeld Follies of 1923 – revue – sketch writer
 Kid Boots (1923) – musical comedy – actor in the role of "Kid Boots" (the Caddie Master)
 Ziegfeld Follies of 1927 – revue – performer, co-bookwriter
 Whoopee! (1928) – musical comedy – actor in the role of "Henry Williams"
 Eddie Cantor at the Palace (1931) – solo performance
 Banjo Eyes (1941) – musical comedy – actor in the role of "Erwin Trowbridge"
 Nellie Bly (1946) – musical comedy – co-producer

Radio and recordings

Radio
Cantor appeared on radio as early as February 3, 1922, as indicated by this news item from Connecticut's Bridgeport Telegram:
Local radio operators listened to one of the finest programs yet produced over the radiophone last night. The program of entertainment which included some of the stars of Broadway musical comedy and vaudeville was broadcast from the Newark, New Jersey station WDY and the Pittsburgh, Pennsylvania station KDKA, both of the Westinghouse Electric and Manufacturing Company. The Newark entertainment started at 7 o'clock: a children's half-hour of music and fairy stories; 7:[35?], Hawaiian airs and violin solo; 8:00, news of the day; and at 8:20, a radio party with nationally known comedians participating; 9:55, Arlington time signals and 10:01, a government weather report. G.E. Nothnagle, who conducts a radiophone station at his home 176 Waldemere Avenue said last night that he was delighted with the program, especially with the numbers sung by Eddie Cantor. The weather conditions are excellent for receiving, he continued, the tone and the quality of the messages was fine.

Cantor's appearance with Rudy Vallee on Vallee's The Fleischmann's Yeast Hour on February 5, 1931, led to a four-week tryout with The Chase and Sanborn Hour. Replacing Maurice Chevalier, who was returning to Paris, Cantor joined Chase and Sanborn on September 13, 1931. This hour-long Sunday evening variety series teamed Cantor with announcer Jimmy Wallington and violinist Dave Rubinoff. The show established Cantor as a leading comedian, and his scriptwriter, David Freedman, as "the Captain of Comedy". Freedman's team included, among others, Samuel "Doc" Kurtzman, who also wrote for song-and-dance man, Al Jolson, and the comedian Jack Benny. Cantor soon became the world's highest-paid radio star. His shows began with a crowd chanting "We want Can-tor! We want Can-tor!", a phrase said to have originated in vaudeville, when the audience chanted to chase off an act on the bill before Cantor. Cantor's theme song was his own lyric to the Leo Robin/Richard Whiting song, "One Hour with You". His radio sidekicks included Bert Gordon, (comic Barney Gorodetsky, AKA The Mad Russian) and Harry Parke (better known as Parkyakarkus). Cantor also discovered and helped guide the career of singer Dinah Shore, first featuring her on his radio show in 1940, as well as other performers, including Deanna Durbin, Bobby Breen in 1936, and Eddie Fisher in 1949.

Indicative of his effect on the mass audience, he agreed in November 1934 to introduce a new song by the songwriters J. Fred Coots and Haven Gillespie that other well-known artists had rejected as being "silly" and "childish". The song, "Santa Claus Is Comin' to Town", immediately had orders for 100,000 copies of sheet music the next day. It sold 400,000 copies by Christmas of that year.

His NBC radio show Time to Smile was broadcast from 1940 to 1946, followed by his Pabst Blue Ribbon Show from 1946 through 1949. He also served as emcee of Take It or Leave It during 1949–1950, and hosted a weekly disc jockey program for Philip Morris during the 1952–1953 season. In addition to film and radio, Cantor recorded for Hit of the Week Records, then again for Columbia, for Banner and Decca and various small labels.

In the early 1960s, he syndicated the short radio segment "Ask Eddie Cantor".

His heavy political involvement began early in his career, including his participation in the strike to form Actors Equity in 1919, provoking the anger of father figure and producer, Florenz Ziegfeld. At the 1939 New York World's Fair, Cantor publicly denounced antisemitic radio personality Father Charles Coughlin and then was dropped by his radio sponsor Camel cigarettes. A year and a half later, Cantor was able to return to the air because of help from his friend Jack Benny.

Recordings
Cantor began making phonograph records in 1917, recording both comedy songs and routines and popular songs of the day, first for Victor, then for Aeoleon-Vocalion, Pathé, and Emerson. From 1921 through 1925, he had an exclusive contract with Columbia Records, returning to Victor for the remainder of the decade.

Cantor was one of the era's most successful entertainers, but the 1929 stock market crash took away his multimillionaire status and left him deeply in debt. However, Cantor's relentless attention to his own earnings to avoid the poverty he knew growing up caused him to use his writing talent, quickly building a new bank account with his highly popular, bestselling books of humor and cartoons about his experience, Caught Short! A Saga of Wailing Wall Street in 1929 "A.C." (After Crash), and Yoo-Hoo, Prosperity!

Cantor was also a composer, with his most famous song seldom attributed to him. In 1935, along with Charles Tobias (Ida's brother) and Murray Mencher, Cantor wrote "Merrily We Roll Along". It was adapted as the theme song for the Merrie Melodies series of animated cartoons, distributed by Warner Brothers Pictures between 1936 and 1964. Cantor himself was frequently caricatured in Warner cartoons of the period, (see Film and television: Animation).

Film and television

Cantor also made numerous film appearances. He had previously appeared in a number of short films, performing his Follies songs and comedy routines, and two silent features (Special Delivery and Kid Boots) in the 1920s. He was offered the lead in The Jazz Singer after it was turned down by George Jessel. Cantor also turned the role down (so it went to Al Jolson), but he became a leading Hollywood star in 1930 with the film version of Whoopee!, shot in two-color Technicolor. He continued making films over the next two decades until his last starring role in If You Knew Susie (1948). From 1950 to 1954, Cantor was a regular guest host on the television variety series The Colgate Comedy Hour.
On May 25, 1944, pioneer television station WPTZ (now KYW-TV) in Philadelphia presented a special, all-star telecast which was also seen in New York over WNBT (now WNBC) and featured cut-ins from their Rockefeller Center studios. Cantor, one of the first major stars to agree to appear on television, was to sing "We're Havin' a Baby, My Baby and Me". Arriving shortly before airtime at the New York studios, Cantor was reportedly told to cut the song because the NBC New York censors considered some of the lyrics too risqué. Cantor refused, claiming no time to prepare an alternative number. NBC relented, but the sound was cut and the picture blurred on certain lines in the song. This is considered the first instance of television censorship.

In 1950, he became the first of several hosts alternating on the NBC television variety show The Colgate Comedy Hour, in which he would introduce musical acts, stage and film stars and play comic characters such as "Maxie the Taxi". In the spring of 1952, Cantor landed in an unlikely controversy when a young Sammy Davis, Jr., appeared as a guest performer. Cantor embraced Davis and mopped Davis's brow with his handkerchief after his performance. When worried sponsors led NBC to threaten cancellation of the show, Cantor's response was to book Davis for two more weeks. Cantor suffered a heart attack following a September 1952 Colgate broadcast, and thereafter, curtailed his appearances until his final program in 1954. In 1955, he appeared in a filmed series for syndication and a year later, appeared in two dramatic roles ("George Has A Birthday", on NBC's Matinee Theatre broadcast in color, and "Size.man and Son" on CBS's Playhouse 90). He continued to appear as a guest on several shows, and was last seen on the NBC color broadcast of The Future Lies Ahead on January 22, 1960, which also featured Mort Sahl.

Animation
Cantor appears in caricature form in numerous Looney Tunes cartoons produced for Warner Bros., although he was often voiced by an imitator. Beginning with I Like Mountain Music (1933), other animated Cantor cameos include Shuffle Off to Buffalo (Harman-Ising, 1933) and Billboard Frolics (Friz Freleng, 1935). Eddie Cantor is one of the four "down on their luck" stars (along with Bing Crosby, Al Jolson, and Jack Benny) snubbed by Elmer Fudd in What’s Up, Doc? (Bob McKimson, 1950). In Farm Frolics (Bob Clampett, 1941), a horse, asked by the narrator to "do a canter", promptly launches into a singing, dancing, eye-rolling impression. The Cantor gag that got the most mileage, however, was his oft-repeated wish for a son after five famous daughters. Slap-Happy Pappy (Clampett, 1940) features an "Eddie Cackler" rooster that wants a boy, to little avail. Other references can be found in Baby Bottleneck (Clampett, 1946) and Circus Today (Tex Avery, 1940). In Merrie Melodies, The Coo-Coo Nut Grove Cantor's many daughters are referenced by a group of singing quintuplet girls. In Porky’s Naughty Nephew (Clampett, 1938) a swimming Cantor gleefully adopts a "buoy". An animated Cantor also appears prominently in Walt Disney's "Mother Goose Goes Hollywood" (Wilfred Jackson, 1938) as Little Jack Horner, who sings "Sing a Song of Sixpence".

Books and merchandising

Cantor's popularity led to merchandising of such products as Eddie Cantor's Tell It to the Judge game from Parker Brothers. In 1933, Brown and Bigelow published a set of 12 Eddie Cantor caricatures by Frederick J. Garner. The advertising cards were purchased in bulk as a direct-mail item by such businesses as auto body shops, funeral directors, dental laboratories, and vegetable wholesale dealers. With the full set, companies could mail a single Cantor card each month for a year to their selected special customers as an ongoing promotion. Cantor was often caricatured on the covers of sheet music and in magazines and newspapers. Cantor was depicted as a balloon in the Macy's Thanksgiving Day Parade, one of the very few balloons based on a real person.

In addition to Caught Short!, Cantor wrote or co-wrote at least seven other books, including booklets released by the then-fledgling firm of Simon & Schuster, with Cantor's name on the cover. (Some were "as told to" or written with David Freedman.) Customers paid a dollar and received the booklet with a penny embedded in the hardcover. They sold well, and H.L. Mencken asserted that the books did more to pull America out of the Great Depression than all government measures combined.

Activism and philanthropy 
Cantor was the second president of the Screen Actors Guild, serving from 1933 to 1935.

He invented the title "The March of Dimes" for the donation campaigns of the National Foundation for Infantile Paralysis, which was organized to combat polio. It was a play on The March of Time newsreels popular at the time. He began the first campaign on his radio show in January 1938, asking listeners to mail a dime to President Franklin D. Roosevelt. At that time, Roosevelt was the most notable American victim of polio. Other entertainers joined in the appeal via their own shows, and the White House mail room was deluged with 2,680,000 dimes—a large sum at the time.

Cantor also recorded a spoken introduction on a 1938 Decca recording of Alexander's Ragtime Band by Bing Crosby and Connee Boswell in which he thanks the listener for buying the record, which supported the National Foundation for Infantile Paralysis. That record hit No. 1 on the charts, though Cantor did not sing on it. A lifelong Democrat, Cantor supported Adlai Stevenson during the 1952 presidential election.

Tributes
Cantor was profiled on This Is Your Life, a program in which an unsuspecting person (usually a celebrity) would be surprised on live television by host Ralph Edwards, with a half-hour tribute. Cantor was the only subject who was told of the "surprise" in advance; he was recovering from a heart attack, and it was felt that the shock might harm him.

In 1951 he received an honorary doctorate from Temple University.

On October 29, 1995, as part of a nationwide celebration of the 75th anniversary of radio, Cantor was posthumously inducted into the Radio Hall of Fame at Chicago's Museum of Broadcasting Communication.

There was an Eddie Cantor caricature featured in Comedy Store, and flashing lights on it marked the end of auditions for comedians. 

Warner Bros., in an attempt to duplicate the box-office success of The Jolson Story, filmed a big-budget Technicolor feature film The Eddie Cantor Story (1953). The film found an audience but might have done better with someone else in the leading role. Actor Keefe Brasselle played Cantor as a caricature with high-pressure dialogue and bulging eyes wide open; the fact that Brasselle was considerably taller than Cantor did not lend realism. Eddie and Ida Cantor were seen in a brief prologue and epilogue set in a projection room, where they are watching Brasselle in action; at the end of the film, Eddie tells Ida "I never looked better in my life"... and gives the audience a knowing, incredulous look. George Burns, in his memoir All My Best Friends, claimed that Warner Bros. created a miracle producing the movie in that "it made Eddie Cantor's life boring".

Something closer to the real Eddie Cantor story is his self-produced feature Show Business (1944), a valentine to vaudeville and show folks, which was RKO's top-grossing film that year.

Probably the best summary of Cantor's career is on one of the Colgate Comedy Hour shows. Re-issued on DVD as Eddie Cantor in Person, the hour-long episode is a virtual video autobiography, with Eddie recounting his career, singing his greatest hits, and recreating his singing-waiter days with another vaudeville legend, his old pal Jimmy Durante.

Cantor appears as a recurring character, played by Stephen DeRosa, on the series Boardwalk Empire.

Personal life and family 

Cantor adopted the first name "Eddie" when he met his future wife Ida Tobias in 1913, because she felt that "Izzy" was not the right name for an actor. Cantor and Ida (1892–1962) were married on June 6, 1914. They had five daughters – Marjorie (1915–1959), Natalie (1916–1997), Edna (1919–2003), Marilyn (1921–2010), and Janet (1927–2018). The girls provided comic fodder for Cantor's longtime running gag, especially on radio, about his five unmarriageable daughters. Several radio historians, including Gerald Nachman (Raised on Radio), have said that this gag did not always sit well with the girls. Natalie's second husband was the French-born American actor Robert Clary, who was best known for his role as Corporal Louis LeBeau on Hogan's Heroes. Janet married the actor Roberto Gari.

Following the death of their daughter Marjorie at the age of 44, Eddie's and Ida's health declined rapidly. Ida died on August 9, 1962, at age 70 of "cardiac insufficiency", and Eddie died on October 10, 1964, in Beverly Hills, California, after suffering his second heart attack at age 72. He is interred in Hillside Memorial Park Cemetery, a Jewish cemetery in Culver City, California.

Filmography

 A Few Moments With Eddie Cantor, Star of "Kid Boots" (1923, DeForest Phonofilm sound-on-film short film) as Himself
 Kid Boots (1926) as Samuel (Kid) Boots
 Special Delivery (1927) as Eddie Beagle – the Mail Carrier
 That Party in Person (1929, Short) as Eddie Cantor
 A Ziegfeld Midnight Frolic (1929, Short) as Himself
 Glorifying the American Girl (1929) as Eddie Cantor – Appearance in Revue Scenes
 Insurance (1930, Short) as Sidney B. Zwieback
 Getting a Ticket (1930, Short) as Himself
 Whoopee! (1930) as Henry Williams
 Palmy Days (1931) as Eddie Simpson
 Talking Screen Snapshots (1932, Documentary short) as Himself
 The Kid from Spain (1932) as Eddie Williams
 Roman Scandals (1933) as Eddie / Oedipus
 The Hollywood Gad-About (1934, Documentary short) as Himself (uncredited)
 Kid Millions (1934) as Eddie Wilson Jr.
 Strike Me Pink (1936) as Eddie Pink
 Ali Baba Goes to Town (1937) as Ali Baba
 The March of Time Volume IV, Issue 5 (1937, Documentary short) as Himself
 Forty Little Mothers (1940) as Gilbert Jordan Thompson
 Thank Your Lucky Stars (1943) as Eddie Cantor / Joe Simpson
 Show Business (1944, also producer) as Eddie Martin
 Hollywood Canteen (1944) as Himself
 Screen Snapshots: Radio Shows (1945, Short) as Eddie – The Eddie Cantor Program
 American Creed (1946, Short) as Self
 Meet Mr. Mischief (1947, Short, appears on poster) as Face on Station Program Poster (uncredited)
 If You Knew Susie (1948) as Sam Parker
 Screen Snapshots: Hollywood's Happy Homes (1949, Documentary short) as Himself
 The Story of Will Rogers (1952) as Himself
 Screen Snapshots: Memorial to Al Jolson (1952, Documentary short) as Himself
 The Eddie Cantor Story (1953) cameo appearance and singing voice dubbing for Keefe Brasselle

Bibliography 
 My Life Is in Your Hands by Eddie Cantor (1928) with David Freedman; Harper & Bros.
 Caught Short!: A Saga of Wailing Wall Street by Eddie Cantor (1929) Simon & Schuster
 Between the Acts by Eddie Cantor (1930) Simon & Schuster
 Yoo-Hoo, Prosperity!: The Eddie Cantor Five-Year Plan by Eddie Cantor (1931) with David Freedman; Simon & Schuster
 The Rise of the Goldbergs by Gertrude Berg (1931) Foreword by Eddie Cantor; Barse & Co.
 Your Next President! by Eddie Cantor (1932) with David Freedman, Illus. by S.L. Hydeman; Ray Long & Richard R. Smith, Inc.
 Eddie Cantor in An Hour with You: A Big Little Book (1934) Whitman
 Eddie Cantor Song and Joke Book (1934) Illus. by Ben Harris; M. Witmark & Sons
 Ziegfeld: The Great Glorifier by Eddie Cantor (1934) with David Freedman; Alfred H. King
 World's Book of Best Jokes by Eddie Cantor (1943) World Publishing Co.
 Hello, Momma by George Jessel (1946) Foreword by Eddie Cantor, Illus. by Carl Rose; World Publishing Co.
 Take My Life by Eddie Cantor (1957) with Jane Kesner Ardmore; Doubleday
 No Man Stands Alone by Barney Ross (1957) Foreword by Eddie Cantor; B. Lippincott Co.
 The Way I See It by Eddie Cantor (1959) with Phyllis Rosenteur, ed.; Prentice-Hall
 As I Remember Them by Eddie Cantor (1963) Duell, Sloan & Pearce
 Yoo-Hoo, Prosperity! and Caught Short! by Eddie Cantor (1969) Greenwood Press
 "The Eddie Cantor Story: A Jewish Life in Performance and Politics" by David Weinstein (2017) UPNE/Brandeis University Press
 The Golden Age of Sound Comedy: Comic Films and Comedians of the Thirties by Donald W. McCaffrey (1973) A.S. Barnes
 Radio Comedy by Arthur Frank Wertheim (1979) Oxford University Press
 The Vaudevillians: A Dictionary of Vaudeville Performers by Anthony Slide (1981) Arlington House
 American Vaudeville as Seen by Its Contemporaries by Charles W. Stein, ed. (1984) Alfred A. Knopf
 Eddie Cantor: A Life in Show Business by Gregory Koseluk (1995) McFarland
 Eddie Cantor: A Bio-Bibliography by James Fisher (1997) Greenwood Press
 Banjo Eyes: Eddie Cantor and the Birth of Modern Stardom by Herbert G. Goldman (1997) Oxford University Press
 The Great American Broadcast: A Celebration of Radio's Golden Age by Leonard Maltin (1997) Dutton
 My Life Is in Your Hands and Take My Life by Eddie Cantor (2000) Cooper Square Press
 Film Clowns of the Depression: Twelve Defining Comic Performances by Wes D. Gehring (2007) McFarland
 Eddie Cantor in Laugh Land by Harold Sherman (2008) Kessinger Publishing
 Angels We Have Heard: The Christmas Song Stories by James Adam Richliano (2002) Star Of Bethlehem Books (Includes a chapter on Cantor's involvement in the history of "Santa Claus Is Comin' To Town").
 The Eddie Cantor Story: A Jewish Life in Performance and Politics by David Weinstein (2018) UPNE/Brandeis University Press

References

Further reading
 
 Weinstein, David (2018). The Eddie Cantor Story: A Jewish Life in Performance and Politics. Hanover, NH: UPNE/Brandeis University Press.
 A Few Moments with Eddie Cantor, Star of "Kid Boots" (1923) A six-minute film made in Phonofilm by Lee De Forest featuring Cantor telling monologues and singing two songs in one of the earliest surviving sound motion pictures.
 OTR Network Library: The Eddie Cantor Show (11 1936 – 52 episodes)

External links

 
 
 Cantor's Sidekick: Bert 'The Mad Russian' Gordon @WFMU
 Eddie Cantor at Virtual History
 FBI file on Eddie Cantor

1892 births
Eddie Cantor
1964 deaths
20th-century American comedians
20th-century American male actors
20th-century American singers
20th-century American male singers
Academy Honorary Award recipients
American autobiographers
American humanitarians
American male radio actors
American people of Russian-Jewish descent
Audio Fidelity Records artists
Blackface minstrel performers
Burials at Hillside Memorial Park Cemetery
Comedians from New York City
California Democrats
Jewish American comedians
Jewish American male actors
Jewish American musicians
Jewish singers
Eddie Cantor
New York (state) Democrats
Presidents of the Screen Actors Guild
RCA Victor artists
Screen Actors Guild Life Achievement Award
Vaudeville performers
Ziegfeld Follies
20th-century American Jews
Members of The Lambs Club
Presidents of the American Federation of Television and Radio Artists
United Service Organizations entertainers
Victor Records artists
Emerson Records artists
Columbia Records artists
Melotone Records (US) artists